The Russian Cultural Center is a museum and building in Washington, D.C., supporting Russian culture in the United States and preserving its causes and beliefs. It calls itself, "the official home of Russian culture in the United States," and hosts public events featuring visiting Russian musicians and artists to foster better relations and understanding between the U.S. and Russia. The center is operated by Rossotrudnichestvo, an autonomous agency of the Russian Foreign Ministry.

The building was a private residence before it was purchased by the Soviet government in 1957. It was initially used as a school for the children of embassy staff, then housed the Soviet consulate in the 1970s and 1980s. In 1998, the building was designated as the Russian Cultural Center by a bilateral agreement. The center opened on December 10, 1999, with an announcement by Valentina Tereshkova, the first woman in space.

Since at least 2001, the center has organized all-expenses-paid cultural exchange trips to Russia for young Americans. The trips included lodging at luxury hotels and meetings with Russian officials.

Controversies
In October 2013, the center's director, Yury Zaitsev, was investigated by the FBI for allegedly using the center's cultural exchange program to recruit young Americans as Russian spies. The FBI interviewed Americans sent by Zaitsev and warned them they were being targeted for recruitment. Zaitsev publicly denied the allegations before quietly leaving the country.

Zaitsev's replacement, Oleg Zhiganov, was suspected of being a Russian spy and expelled from the U.S. as part of the expulsions of Russian diplomats in March 2018 in retaliation for the poisoning of Sergei and Yulia Skripal in Salisbury, England.

References

External links

 Official website

1999 establishments in Washington, D.C.
Ethnic museums in Washington, D.C.
Russia–United States relations
Russian-American culture in Washington, D.C.
Russian-American history